Two ships of the Royal Navy have borne the name HMS Sepoy, whilst another two were planned but never entered service:

 HMS Sepoy was to have been a wooden  screw gunvessel. She was ordered in 1846 but was cancelled in 1849.
  was a wooden  screw gunboat launched in 1856 and broken up in 1868.
  was an  launched in 1918 and sold in 1932.

Royal Navy ship names